Jonathan Richman and the Modern Lovers is the first album by American rock band Jonathan Richman and the Modern Lovers, released by Beserkley Records in July 1976.

Track listing

2000 re-issue bonus 12"

Personnel
Jonathan Richman and the Modern Lovers
Jonathan Richman – vocals, guitars
Greg 'Curly' Keranen – bass, vocals
Leroy Radcliffe – guitar, vocals
David Robinson – drums, vocals

Technical
Matthew King Kaufman – producer
Glen Kolotkin – producer, engineer
Tom Lubin – assistant engineer
Fabian Bachrach – cover photography
Elsa Dorfman – photography
George Horn – mastering
Flaming Neon – LP concept
Jim Blodgett – LP coordination

References

1976 albums
Jonathan Richman albums
Beserkley Records albums
Albums produced by Glen Kolotkin